The 2013 Open 88 Contrexéville was a professional tennis tournament played on outdoor clay courts. It was the seventh edition of the tournament which was part of the 2013 ITF Women's Circuit, offering a total of $50,000 in prize money. It took place in Contrexéville, France, on 15–21 July 2013.

Singles main draw entrants

Seeds 

 1 Rankings as of 8 July 2013

Other entrants 
The following players received wildcards into the singles main draw:
  Océane Adam
  Fiona Ferro
  Victoria Muntean
  Anaève Pain

The following players received entry from the qualifying draw:
  Alix Collombon
  Silvia Njirić
  Lisanne van Riet
  Nina Zander

The following player received entry through a Junior Exempt:
  Ana Konjuh

Champions

Women's singles 

  Timea Bacsinszky def.  Beatriz García Vidagany 6–1, 6–1

Women's doubles 

  Vanesa Furlanetto /  Amandine Hesse def.  Ana Konjuh /  Silvia Njirić 7–6(7–3), 6–4

External links 
 Official website
 2013 Open 88 Contrexéville at ITFtennis.com

2013 ITF Women's Circuit
Grand Est Open 88
2013 in French tennis